TRL Krosaki Refractories Limited  (Formerly Tata Refractories Limited and TRL) is an Indian refractory company. It was established in 1958 in Belpahar, a city in Jharsuguda district of Odisha.

It mainly produces basic, dolomite, high alumina, monolithics, silica, flow control products and tap hole clay refractories having a consolidated installed capacity of 304,760 tonnes per annum .

Its key customers are the steel, cement, glass, copper and aluminium industries. During the year 2010–2011, the company achieved the distinction of being the first Indian refractories company to cross  consolidated turnover.

History
In 1958, Tata Steel formed a new refractory factory at Belpahar in collaboration with the German company Didier-Werke (de). It was later renamed Tata Refractories under the Tata Group. In 2011, Tata sold 51% of its shares to Krosaki Harima Corporation of Japan, and the refractory company's name was changed to TRL-Krosaki Refractories Limited.

References

 
Indian companies established in 1958
Companies based in Odisha
1958 establishments in Orissa
Jharsuguda district